Aurel Moiș (born 29 August 1948) is a Romanian ice hockey player. He competed in the men's tournament at the 1968 Winter Olympics.

References

1948 births
Living people
Olympic ice hockey players of Romania
Ice hockey players at the 1968 Winter Olympics
Place of birth missing (living people)